This is a list of the French SNEP Top 100 Singles number-ones of 1996.

Number-ones by week

Singles Chart

See also
1996 in music
List of number-one hits (France)
List of artists who reached number one on the French Singles Chart

References

1996 in French music
1996 record charts
Lists of number-one songs in France